Bhubaneswar Mishra (born 9 November 1961) is an Indian American computer scientist and professor at the Courant Institute of Mathematical Sciences of New York University. He is known for his applied contributions to bioinformatics, cybersecurity, and computational finance. Mishra is listed as an ISI highly cited researcher in Computer Science.

Career
Born in Bhubaneswar, India, Mishra received a B.Tech. degree in Electronics and Electrical Engineering from the Indian Institute of Technology Kharagpur in 1980. He then received M.S. and Ph.D. degrees in Computer Science from Carnegie Mellon University in 1982 and 1985, respectively. His Ph.D. thesis advisor was Edmund M. Clarke. He began his scientific career as an instructor at the Courant Institute of Mathematical Sciences from 1973 to 1975. He is also a visiting scholar at the Cold Spring Harbor Laboratory, as well as a co-founder in OpGen, a computational biology company. He also maintains a position as principal investigator at the Center for Malicious Behavior and Model Checking.

Awards and honors
Mishra is a fellow of the Association for Computing Machinery (2007), of the IEEE (2009), and of the American Association for the Advancement of Science (2010).

References

Carnegie Mellon University alumni
Indian Institutes of Technology alumni
Courant Institute of Mathematical Sciences faculty
American computer scientists
20th-century American mathematicians
21st-century American mathematicians
20th-century Indian mathematicians
1961 births
Living people
Fellows of the American Association for the Advancement of Science
Fellows of the Association for Computing Machinery
Fellow Members of the IEEE
Scientists from Bhubaneswar
Indian American